The Beagle B.206 is a 1960s British seven-seat twin-piston engined liaison and communication aircraft built by Beagle Aircraft Limited at Shoreham Airport and Rearsby Aerodrome.

Design and development

The design of a twin-engined light transport began in 1960 as part of Bristol Aircraft at Filton termed the Bristol 220 but after the formation of BAC Peter Masefield , MD of Bristol Aircraft took  the project to Beagle. The prototype registered G-ARRM (designated the B.206X) first flew from Shoreham Airport, West Sussex on 15 August 1961. The prototype aircraft was a five-seat all metal low-wing monoplane powered by two Continental flat-six engines. Owned since 1990 by Brooklands Museum then loaned to the Bristol Aero Collection before eventually being restored by a team of volunteers at Shoreham Airport, it was loaned to the Farnborough Air Sciences Trust Museum at Farnborough, Hampshire from 2011 until 2017. With the expiry of the loan agreement, it was dismantled and transported from FAST to Brooklands by road on 3 August 2017.

The second prototype (registered G-ARXM and designated B.206Y) was slightly larger with a larger-span wing and seating for seven. Two aircraft (designated B.206Z) were built for evaluation by the Ministry of Aviation at Boscombe Down and an order for twenty aircraft (designated B.206R) for the Royal Air Force followed. The RAF aircraft were designated Basset CC.1 and were built at Rearsby Aerodrome, Leicestershire.

Initial production was the Series 1 aircraft which were powered by 310 hp Rolls-Royce Continental GIO-470A engines, and the first aircraft (G-ASMK) first flew on 17 July 1964. This aircraft was then converted as the first Series 2 aircraft with 340 hp Continental GTSIO-520C turbocharged engines and first flew as such on 23 June 1965. The production Series 2 (initially known as the B.206S) was also fitted with a large freight door. The aircraft was soon in demand with air taxi companies and as a light transport for companies. Three aircraft were delivered to the Royal Flying Doctor Service in Australia.

A Series 3 was developed with a raised rear fuselage to carry 10-passengers but only two were flown as such, one modified from a Series 2 airframe (G-35-28 c/n B.074) was used as the "Aerodynamic Test Vehicle" and later re-converted back to a Series 2 as G-AXPV and the second (G-AWLN, c/n B.080) which was converted on the production line and ultimately sold in Brazil; a third airframe (B.037, which had been damaged in production) was converted as a mock-up only and never flown. When the company needed the room at Rearsby to build the Beagle Pup, production of the B.206 ended with the 79th aircraft, (c/n B.080). Four further fuselages and a number of fuselage sections had also been constructed but were never completed.

Operational history

A competition was held at RAF Northolt in March 1963 between the B.206 and the de Havilland Devon for an aircraft to replace the Avro Anson, with the specification designed around the requirement to fly a five-man V-bomber crew, wearing full flying gear, and a ground crew member, from Britain to Malta. Beagle redesigned the aircraft to the larger B.206Y to meet this requirement, with the expectation of an initial order of at least 80 from the RAF. While the B.206 won the competition, only 20 aircraft, to be called the Beagle Basset, were ordered for the RAF. This reduced order placed the profitability of the B.206 in doubt, as Beagle had planned production on a run of at least 250 aircraft. The first delivery to RAF communications squadrons was made in June 1965. It was powered by two Rolls-Royce/Continental GIO-470 six cylinder horizontally-opposed engines giving it a maximum speed of 220 mph and a range of 1,645 miles.  Up to eight persons could be carried. 
 
The Northolt aircraft were originally based at RAF Bovingdon near Watford, Hertfordshire with the Southern Communications Squadron until the 'SCS' moved to Northolt and became 207 Squadron on 4 February 1969.  Another squadron, the Northern Communications Squadron, operated Bassets from RAF Topcliffe near Thirsk in North Yorkshire, moving to RAF Wyton in January 1969 when it became the Training Command Communications Squadron, becoming 26 Squadron in February that year. Most aircraft were removed from RAF service on 2 May 1974 and sold for civil use. 

The first civil-ordered aircraft (a Series 1 registered G-ASWJ) was delivered in May 1965 to Rolls-Royce Limited at Hucknall. In 1975, Rolls-Royce retired this aircraft and donated it to RAF Halton for use by apprentices as 8449M; it is now with the Midland Air Museum at Coventry

An unusual use was for one of the first aircraft registered G-ATHO which was bought by Maidenhead Organ Studios Limited for transporting electronic organs. Other examples were operated by UK-based air charter firms including Air Kilroe.

The type was sold to and operated by civilian firms and individuals in several countries including Australia, Brazil and the United States. Bassets were sold after RAF service to the United States and Paraguay.

Variants

Beagle B.206X
Prototype, 1 built.
Beagle B.206Y
Larger prototype, 1 built.
Beagle B.206Z
Pre-production military version, 2 built.
Beagle B.206R (Basset CC.1)
Military version, 20 built.
Beagle B.206 Series 1 (B.206C)
Seven-seat civil production aircraft, 11 built.
Beagle B.206 Series 2 (B.206S)
Higher-performance civil production aircraft, 45 built.
Beagle B.206 Series 3
10-seat version, 2 converted from Series 2.

Operators

Military operators

Syrian Air Force – one aircraft equipped for survey work.

Royal Air Force
No. 26 Squadron RAF
No. 32 Squadron RAF
No. 207 Squadron RAF
Queen's Flight
Metropolitan Communication Squadron
Northern Communication Squadron
Southern Communication Squadron
Transport Command Communications Squadron
Aeroplane and Armament Experimental Establishment
Empire Test Pilot's School

Planned

South African Air Force ordered 18 aircraft for maritime use but the order was cancelled.

Civil operators

Royal Flying Doctor Service

Maidenhead Organ Studios Limited

Accidents and incidents
 25 May 1964 G-ARXM The 2nd prototype (the sole B.206Y) crashed at Wisborough Green, Surrey, killing the sole occupant, after apparently attempting to perform a roll
 6 Mar 1971. G-AVAL. Continued VFR flight into bad weather. Chouppes, near Poitiers, France.
 5 July 1973 XS783 a Basset CC.1 of 26 Squadron was refuelled with the wrong fuel and crashed on takeoff from RAF Valley. Navigator killed and pilot seriously hurt.
 2 May 1977 – Automotive engineer and General Motors Corporation executive Ed Cole was killed in a Beagle B.206 Series 2 registered N500KR, crashing while making a landing approach to Kalamazoo, Michigan, USA in bad weather.

Specifications (B.206 Series 2)

See also

References

Notes

Bibliography

External links

 http://www.starweb.net/beagle

1960s British civil utility aircraft
Beagle Basset
Basset
Low-wing aircraft
Aircraft first flown in 1961
Twin piston-engined tractor aircraft